Pulse 2 was a local radio station serving Bradford, Kirklees and Calderdale areas from studios in Bradford.

The station was folded into Greatest Hits Radio Yorkshire, as part of a rebrand, on 1 September 2020.

Background

The station was previously known as Pennine Radio, Classic Gold, Great Yorkshire Gold, Great Yorkshire Radio, 1278 and 1530 AM West Yorkshire, West Yorkshire's Big AM, Pennine's Big AM, West Yorkshire's Classic Gold and Pulse Classic Gold and under previous ownership was part of the Yorkshire Radio Network.

When, in 1989, Pennine Radio was split into Pennine FM and Classic Gold, the AM service became part of a network, initially with sister stations in Hull and Sheffield. In 1997, after a management buy-out of the parent company, the Bradford-based radio station became a stand-alone operation, and bosses decided to buy in the former GWR Classic Gold service with opt-outs for local programming, initially at breakfast and later for afternoon drivetime. A couple of years later, Classic Gold was dropped in favour of becoming part of the BIG AM network with sister stations in Stoke and Manchester. Shortly after though, Classic Gold reappeared, simulcasting the GWR/UBC Classic Gold and latterly GCap Gold network with local afternoon programming for West Yorkshire remaining. However, on 1 December 2008 the station was re-launched as a fully local service for West Yorkshire and was one of the last legacy ILR AM stations in England to broadcast local programming.

Station rebrand
On 8 February 2019, Pulse 2 and the Wireless Group's local radio stations were sold to Bauer Radio. The sale was ratified in March 2020 following an inquiry by the Competition and Markets Authority.

On 27 May 2020, it was announced that Pulse 2 would join Bauer's Greatest Hits Radio network.

On 13 July 2020, local programming outside weekday breakfast was replaced by networked output from the GHR network, with Pulse 2 retaining its own branding.

On 1 September 2020, the station rebranded as Greatest Hits Radio and merged with ten stations in Yorkshire and Lincolnshire. The station's local breakfast show was replaced by a regional drivetime show. Localised news bulletins, traffic updates and advertising are retained.

References

External links
 

Mass media in Bradford
Radio stations in Yorkshire
Radio stations established in 1989
Bauer Radio
Greatest Hits Radio